Patrick John Brough (born 20 February 1996) is an English footballer who plays for Barrow.

Career

Carlisle United
Brough began his career with Carlisle United and made his professional debut in a 3–3 draw (4-3 win on penalties) against Blackburn Rovers on 7 August 2013 in the Football League Cup.

Loans
In January 2016 he joined Lincoln City on loan.

In November 2016 he again went out on loan, this time to Salford City.

Morecambe
On 29 June 2017, Morecambe signed Brough on a free transfer following his release by Carlisle.

He was released by Morecambe at the end of the 2017–18 season.

Falkirk
Brough signed a one-year contract with Scottish Championship club Falkirk in May 2018, effective from 1 July.

Barrow
Brough joined Barrow on 17 June 2019. He formed part of the team that won the National League in 2020, gaining promotion to League Two.

Career statistics

Club

References

External links

Living people
1996 births
Footballers from Carlisle, Cumbria
English footballers
Association football midfielders
Carlisle United F.C. players
Lincoln City F.C. players
Salford City F.C. players
Morecambe F.C. players
Falkirk F.C. players
Barrow A.F.C. players
English Football League players
Scottish Professional Football League players
National League (English football) players